Nafiz Bezhani (1928–2004) was an Albanian jurist, politician and writer.

Life 
Born in 1928 in Fterrë, southern Albania, and was educated at the Faculty of Law of the University of Tirana. In 1943 he joined the National Liberation Movement and was elected a delegate of the First Council of the Anti-fascist Youth in August 1944. After the 1956 conference of the Party of Labour of Albania he was expelled from the party.

In 1992 he became a member of the Court of Cassation and in 1997 head of the Verification Committee of the Parliament of Albania, which was responsible for finding out possible agents of the Sigurimi that held political and judicial offices in post-Communist Albania.

Sources 

1936 births
People from Tepelenë
20th-century Albanian politicians
20th-century Albanian judges
2004 deaths
20th-century Albanian writers
University of Tirana alumni